Wenzhou Medical College (WMC), under the auspices of the School of International Studies, runs the International Medical School program.

History 
Since the inception of the English-Medium Medical programs in China (circa 2006), a new school was added to the WMC - the School of International Studies (SIS) - which has a unique character required to match the unique task of training international students as future medical doctors as stipulated by the Ministry of Education. It is charged with running the International Medical School (IMS) and the Confucius Center at Burapha University (Thailand). Currently the student body consists of over 400 students, with a diversity comprising more than 40 nationalities.

Campuses 
The International Medical School is administratively based at the Chashan campus, located in the University Town (高教园区). Student instruction is also carried out at the Chashan campus for the students' preliminary 3 years. In the course of the fourth year, the students are moved to the "Old Campus" at Xuéyuàn Lù (学院路), which is in the vicinity of the school's various affiliated teaching hospitals.

Organization

Departments 

Medical Department (MBBS)
Dental Department (BDS)

Affiliated Hospitals 

The 1st Affiliated Hospital
The 2nd Affiliated Hospital & Yuying Children's Hospital
The Affiliated Hospital of Stomatology

These three hospitals, all located in the Wenzhou city, are principally tasked with supplying the practical portions of the students' medical/dental experience.

Traditions

The Independence Cup 

This was initially established as a celebration of the Ghanaian and Mauritian Independence days (March 6 and March 12 respectively), and is celebrated with a customary football match between the students from these two nationalities. It has since been expanded to include a customary challenge in which both of these teams will go on to face a “World Team”, consisting of students from every other nationality within the IMS. (Unfortunately, it appears that only one of the team ever goes on to face the World Team)

See also 
Wenzhou Medical College

References

External links 

Official Wenzhou Medical College Website  
Official Wenzhou Medical College, SIS Website  

IMS